Maximiliano Jorge "Max" Caldas (born 9 March 1973) is an Argentine field hockey defender, who made his debut for the national squad in 1994, and competed for his native country in the 1996 Summer Olympics and the 2004 Summer Olympics.

Caldas, the former husband of Australian Hockey Olympian Alyson Annan, played for four years in the Netherlands, at HC Klein Zwitserland, before retiring due to injury. He then started a career as a hockey coach. His first team to be coached was Leiden Heren 1 (Men), he finished second in the Dutch 'eerste klasse' (1st class). Caldas coaches Amsterdam Dames 1 (Women) in the Dutch 'Hoofdklasse' (highest league) since the summer of 2006. Caldas was the assistant-coach of the Dutch women's national team, that became world champion on 8 October 2006 and captured the gold medal at the 2008 Summer Olympics in Beijing, PR China. 
Since 2010 Maximiliano Caldas is the Dutch women's national team coach. On the 2012 Olympics he won gold as a coach with the Dutch women's. They also grabbed the gold at the first edition of the Hockey World League in 2013. In June 2014 he won his third gold with the Dutch women at the Hockey World Cup in The Hague. He is now in charge of the Spanish men's hockey team.

References

External links
 

1973 births
Living people
Argentine male field hockey players
Male field hockey defenders
Argentine field hockey coaches
Olympic field hockey players of Argentina
People from San Isidro, Buenos Aires
Sportspeople from Buenos Aires Province
Field hockey players at the 1996 Summer Olympics
2002 Men's Hockey World Cup players
Field hockey players at the 2004 Summer Olympics
Pan American Games gold medalists for Argentina
Pan American Games medalists in field hockey
HC Klein Zwitserland players
Field hockey players at the 1995 Pan American Games
Medalists at the 1995 Pan American Games
Argentine expatriate sportspeople in the Netherlands
Olympic coaches